Peter August Friedrich, Duke of Schleswig-Holstein-Sonderburg-Beck (7 December 1697 – 22 March 1775) was a Duke of Schleswig-Holstein-Sonderburg-Beck. He was the fifth and youngest son of Frederick Louis, Duke of Schleswig-Holstein-Sonderburg-Beck and his wife, Duchess Louise Charlotte of Schleswig-Holstein-Sonderburg-Augustenburg.

Life
Born in Königsberg, Duchy of Prussia, Peter August became Governor General of Reval (Tallinn), Governor of Estonia, and a Field Marshal in the Russian Imperial Army. He died in Reval, Russian Empire.

Biography
He was only the titular duke, because he did not inherit the domain of Haus Beck. It had been inherited by his father's older brother, Duke August (1652–1689), and nephew Frederick William I (1682–1719), and was then sold by the latter's widow to Peter August's older brother, Duke Frederick William II (1687–1749), in 1732. But he re-sold it in 1745 to Baroness Magdalena von Ledebur-Königsbrück. Thus, by the time that Peter August became the head of this cadet branch of the Danish royal dynasty, he was "Duke of Schleswig-Holstein-Sonderburg-Beck" in name only.

He is the male line ancestor of Margrethe II of Denmark, Harald V of Norway, and Charles III of the United Kingdom and the Commonwealth realms.

Marriage and issue
Peter August married Princess Sophie of Hesse-Philippsthal, the daughter of Philip, Landgrave of Hesse-Philippsthal and his wife, Countess Katharina Amalie of Solms-Laubach, at Rinteln on 5 September 1723. Sophie died on 8 May 1728 at age thirty-three. Peter August and Sophie had two sons and one daughter: 
 Prince Karl of Schleswig-Holstein-Sonderburg-Beck (October 1724 – March 1726).
 Princess Ulrike Amelie Wilhelmine of Schleswig-Holstein-Sonderburg-Beck (20 May 1726 – died shortly after).
 Prince Karl Anton August of Schleswig-Holstein-Sonderburg-Beck (10 August 1727 – 12 September 1759).

He married secondly Countess Natalia Nikolaievna Golovina, granddaughter of Count Fyodor Golovin, daughter of Count Nicholas Fedorovich Golovin and his wife, Sophie, on 15 March 1742. The couple had two sons and one daughter: 
 Prince Peter of Schleswig-Holstein-Sonderburg-Beck (1 February 1743 – 3 January 1751).
 Prince Alexander of Schleswig-Holstein-Sonderburg-Beck (born and died 1744).
 Princess Catherine of Schleswig-Holstein-Sonderburg-Beck (23 February 1750 – 10 December 1811); grandmother of Russian field marshal Prince Aleksandr Baryatinsky.

Ancestry

References

1697 births
1775 deaths
Dukes of Schleswig-Holstein-Sonderburg-Beck
Field marshals of Russia
Nobility from Königsberg
People from Tallinn
People from the Governorate of Estonia
Baltic-German people